Gillian Bristol is a diplomat from Grenada, serving as ambassador to the United States and Mexico for the small island nation. She was the first Caribbean Islander to be president of the OAS Staff Association (the professional organization who represents OAS employees to OAS management).

Early life and education
Bristol is the child of Ruth and Carol Bristol and was born in St. Georges, Grenada. Her father Carol is a prominent Grenadian attorney who also served as Chief Justice. She attended St. Joseph's Convent High School in Grenada and Trinidad and Tobago, and earned honors degrees in languages (BA) and law (LLB) from the University of the West Indies in Cave Hill, Barbados in 1988.

Career
From 1992 through to 2008 she worked for the Organization of American States (OAS), as secretary for several committees affiliated with the OAS Permanent Council, as well as Program Manager at the Inter-American Committee Against Terrorism. She was elected as President of the OAS Staff Association in 2007.

In 2009, Bristol was appointed by Prime Minister Tillman Thomas as the country's ambassador to the United States, where she headed Grenada's Mission in Washington, DC. In 2010, she was also accredited as Grenada's non-resident Ambassador to Mexico. Following the 2013 election, she was replaced by Dr. E. Angus Friday.

In August 2016, Bristol joined the newly established Office for Global Affairs at the University of the West Indies at Mona, Jamaica, and was appointed director of the Latin American and Caribbean Centre (LACC).

References

External links
 Address by Ms. Gillian M.S. Bristol as President of OAS Staff Association
 Interview with Ambassador Bristol by Steve Lutes, 2012
 Feature of Ambassador Bristol in Washington Life, 2011
 List of ambassadors of Grenada to the United States

Living people
People from St. George's, Grenada
University of the West Indies alumni
Grenadian women diplomats
Women ambassadors
Year of birth missing (living people)